Pat Hughes (4 June 1939 – October 2017) was a footballer who represented the Australia national soccer team from 1965 to 1967.

Career
Hughes was born in Greenock, Scotland. Hughes played youth football for hometown club Morton, appearing in numerous cup games for the club. Hughes later joined Duntocher Hibernian in Scottish junior football and attracted the attention of Aston Villa, Stoke City and Celtic, the latter of whom signed Duntocher Hibernian teammate Pat Crerand. He emigrated to Australia in 1960, joining New South Wales state league team APIA Leichhardt. Having begun his career as a forward, Hughes later became a midfielder. In 1965 he played for a Sydney XI against Torpedo Moscow and appeared in three representative matches for New South Wales. He made his full international debut for Australia in a 1966 World Cup qualifying match against North Korea in Phnom Penh, Cambodia, on 21 November 1965. Five days later he captained Australia for the first time, against Cambodia. He represented Australia thirteen times (nine times in full internationals), captaining the team on seven occasions, but missed their win at the 1967 South Vietnam Independence Cup due to work commitments. After retiring from playing, he coached at Sutherland Shire.

References

External links

1939 births
2017 deaths
Scottish footballers
Australian soccer players
Footballers from Greenock
Scottish emigrants to Australia
Australia international soccer players
Scottish Junior Football Association players
Greenock Morton F.C. players
Duntocher Hibernian F.C. players
APIA Leichhardt FC players
Association football midfielders
Scottish expatriate footballers
Expatriate soccer players in Australia
Scottish expatriate sportspeople in Australia